Everybody Hapi is a Philippine television sitcom series broadcast by TV5. The series aired from November 23, 2008, to September 4, 2010.

Cast
Final cast
 John Estrada as Jim
 Long Mejia as Carrey
 Alex Gonzaga as Cathy
 Nova Villa as Lola Candy
 Christian Vasquez as Michael
 Jon Avila as Jordan
 Carmi Martin as Ursula
 Carla Humphries as Erika
 Mr. Fu as Ador
 Bogart as B
 Sammy Lagmay as Sam/Sammy

Former cast
 Matt Evans as Steve
 Randolf Stamatelaky as Paul
 Roxanne Guinoo as Jenny
 Eugene Domingo as Babet

References

External links

See also
 List of programs aired by TV5 (Philippines)

TV5 (Philippine TV network) original programming
Philippine television sketch shows
2008 Philippine television series debuts
2010 Philippine television series endings
Filipino-language television shows